Ampelomyia vitiscoryloides, the grape filbert gall midge, is a species of gall midge in the family Cecidomyiidae. It induces galls on grape plants and is widespread in eastern North America. It was first described by Alpheus Spring Packard in 1869.

References

Cecidomyiinae
Insects described in 1869
Gall-inducing insects
Taxa named by Alpheus Spring Packard
Diptera of North America
Articles created by Qbugbot